Super Roots 7 is the sixth installment in the Super Roots EP series by noise rock band Boredoms, released in 1998 by Warner Music Japan.  The band included a credit for "Super thanks to the Mekons," whose song "Where Were You?" influenced the release.

Track listing
"7~ (Ewe Remix)" – 4:04
"7→ (Boriginal)" – 20:55
"7+ (Eye Remix)" – 8:12

Personnel
Yamantaka Eye – vocals, synthesizer, sound effects, electronics, audio mixing, editing, artwork
Yoshimi P-We – drums, vocals, Casio keyboard
Yamamotor – guitar
ATR – drums, samples, percussion
E-da – drums, electronic percussion
Kiyoshi Izumi – samples, synthesizer
Hilah – bass guitar, sound effects
O. G. Hayashi – recording, audio engineering
Masayo Takise – audio mastering

References

Boredoms EPs
1998 EPs